Hebdogiciel was a French computer magazine which was published from 1983 until January 1987. It was printed in a newspaper style format and focused on 8- and 16-bit home computers of the time, such as the Commodore 64, ZX80, Amstrad, and others.

Each issue was a collection of both news articles on computer and software testing, treated satirically, and listings of source code which could be typed in by the reader.

References

External links
 Hebdogiciel back issues provided by abandonware-magazines.org
 

1983 establishments in France
1987 disestablishments in France
Defunct computer magazines
Defunct magazines published in France
French-language magazines
Video game magazines published in France
Magazines established in 1983
Magazines disestablished in 1987